A list of classes of missile boats used by naval forces around the world.

China
 Houbei class (Type 022), the first combat vessel with a catamaran hull.

Croatia

Yugoslavia

Egypt
 Ambassador MK III class

Finland
  - modified version of the Osa class

France
 FACM Class La Combattante IIa - built for export
 FACM Class La Combattante III - built for export

Germany

 Tiger class fast attack craft - exported to Greece, Chile and Egypt
 Albatros class fast attack craft
 Gepard class fast attack craft

Greece
 Roussen Class (Super-Vita) - Used by the Hellenic Navy
 FACM Class La Combattante IIIb - Modified and upgraded version of the French La Combattante III Class.
 FACM Class La Combattante III
 FACM Class La Combattante IIa

India
 Next Generation Fast Attack Crafts (NGFACs)

Indonesia
 Clurit class
 Sampari Class
 Trimaran Fast Attack Craft

Iran
 Thondar class
 Kaman class

Israel
 Sa'ar 3-class missile boat
 Sa'ar 4-class missile boat used by Israel, with variants also in service in South Africa, Sri Lanka and a small number of other countries.
 Sa'ar 4.5-class missile boat used by Israel, with variants also in service in Mexico and Greece.

Italy
 Sparviero class patrol boat class seven now decommissioned Hydrofoils

Japan

 1-go class missile boat - based on Sparviero class patrol boat
 Hayabusa class missile boat

Korea, North
 Nongo-Class missile boat

Korea, South
 Gumdoksuri class patrol vessel

Malaysia
 Handalan class
 Perdana class

Norway
 Skjold - used by Norway, a stealthy surface effect catamaran

Pakistan
 Azmat class - based on Type 037II Houjian-class missile boat
 Jalalat II class
 Jurrat class(improved Jalalat II class)

Philippines
Multi-purpose Attack Craft Mk. 3
Nestor Acero-class Fast Attack Interdiction Craft (4 ships only)

Russia/USSR
 Komar-class missile boat - The world's first missile boat, widely exported
 Osa-class missile boat - probably the worlds numerous missile boat, widely exported
 Matka-class missile boat - hydrofoil missile boat
 Sarancha-class missile boat - hydrofoil missile boat

Sweden
 Stockholm class
 Göteborg class
 Visby class

Taiwan (Republic of China)
 Kuang Hua VI-class missile boat - Indigenously developed for Taiwan's navy
 Hai Ou-class missile boat - based on Dvora-class
 Dvora-class fast patrol boat - Israeli design, armed with missiles by Taiwan

Thailand
 Ratcharit - used by Thailand, a fast attack missile boat

Turkey
 Kılıç - used by Turkey, a fast attack missile boat
 Rüzgar class fast attack craft
 Doğan class fast attack craft
 Kartal class

United States
 Pegasus class, hydrofoils, all six now decommissioned

Vietnam
 BPS-500 class missile boat

Notes

References

Missile